The discography of German music band Tokio Hotel consists of seven studio albums, three live albums, four EPs, two compilation albums, thirty-five singles, thirty-nine music videos, seven lyric videos, five video albums and one movie. Tokio Hotel was formed in 2001 in Magdeburg, Germany, by singer Bill Kaulitz, guitarist Tom Kaulitz, bassist Georg Listing and drummer Gustav Schäfer. The group's debut single, "Durch den Monsun", entered the German singles chart at Number 15 on 20 August 2005, and reached Number 1 the following week. It also reached Number 1 on the Austrian singles chart. It was followed up with the single "Schrei", which failed to match the success of "Durch den Monsun"; its highest chart position was Number 3 in Austria. The band released their debut album, Schrei, on 19 September 2005. It topped the charts in Germany and Austria, and was certified Platinum by the German and Austrian affiliates of the International Federation of the Phonographic Industry (IFPI) and by the Syndicat National de l'Édition Phonographique (SNEP) in France. In 2006, a third and fourth single, "Rette mich" and "Der letzte Tag", were released; both reached Number 1 in Germany and Austria. The lead single from Tokio Hotel's second album, Zimmer 483, was "Übers Ende der Welt", released on 26 January 2007. It became Tokio Hotel's fourth single to have reached Number 1 on the German and Austrian charts. Zimmer 483 was released on 23 February 2007, and reached the top spot on the German albums chart. The album's second single, "Spring nicht", was released on 7 April, charting at Number 3 in Germany, 7 in Austria, and 21 in Switzerland. Zimmer 483 was certified gold in three countries.

On 4 June 2007, Tokio Hotel released their first English language album, Scream, throughout Europe. In countries with German-speaking populations, it was called Room 483; both names are translations of the group's German language albums. Scream contains English-language versions of songs taken from Schrei and Zimmer 483. "Monsoon", the English-language version of "Durch den Monsun", was the first single taken from the album, and reached Number 8 in France and Italy. "Ready, Set, Go!" was released in the United Kingdom, though it failed to enter the Top 40; it spent one week at Number 77 before dropping out of the charts. It later reached Number 80 in Canada and Number 19 on the Bubbling Under Hot 100 Singles chart in the United States. "An deiner Seite (Ich bin da)", from Zimmer 483 was released in Europe on 16 November 2007, followed by four more English language singles from Scream. "An deiner Seite (Ich bin da)", reached Number 2 in France, which was then followed by two singles released in the US. Their first US single, "Tokio Hotel", contains the tracks "Scream" and "Ready, Set, Go!", and was available exclusively at Hot Topic stores. Their second US single, "Scream America!", was released on 11 December 2007. That too contains "Scream" and "Ready, Set, Go!"; the latter is remixed by AFI's Jade Puget. "Don't Jump" was the final single to have been spawned from Scream.

Albums

Studio albums

Compilation albums

Live albums

Extended plays

Singles

Other appearances

Videos

Music videos

Lyric videos

Concert tours
Headlining
 Schrei Tour (2005–2006)
 Zimmer 483 Tour (2007)
 1000 Hotels World Tour (2008)
 Welcome to Humanoid City Tour (2010–2011)
 Feel It All World Tour (2015)
 Dream Machine Tour (2017–2018)
 Melancholic Paradise Tour (2019–2020)
 Beyond the World Tour (2023)

Summer Camp
 Tokio Hotel Summer Camp (2018)
 Tokio Hotel Summer Camp (2019)

Movie
 Tokio Hotel – Hinter Die Welt (2017)

Video albums

References

External links
 Tokio Hotel official website
 
 

Discographies of German artists
Rock music group discographies
Discographies